

53001–53100 

|-id=029
| 53029 Wodetzky ||  || József Wodetzky (1872–1956), a Hungarian astronomer and mathematician who was director of the Astronomical Institute of Pázmány Péter University from 1934 to 1942. His research was in classical astronomy, mainly concerned with the three-body problem and the motion of the Moon. || 
|-id=093
| 53093 La Orotava ||  || La Orotava, a town and municipality in the northern part of the Island of Tenerife || 
|}

53101–53200 

|-id=109
| 53109 Martinphillipps ||  || Martin Phillipps (born 1963) is the lead singer of the Dunedin rock band The Chills, whose music forms the backbone of the so-called "Dunedin sound." || 
|-id=157
| 53157 Akaishidake || 1999 CP || Akaishidake Mountain, Shizuoka, Japan || 
|-id=159
| 53159 Mysliveček ||  || Josef Mysliveček (1737–1781), a Czech composer from the period of early classicism. He worked in Italy (Il divino Boemo) beginning in 1763. He composed orchestral works, oratorios and operas. || 
|}

53201–53300 

|-id=237
| 53237 Simonson ||  || Walter Simonson (born 1946) is an American comic book writer and artist. || 
|-id=250
| 53250 Beucher ||  || Jacqueline Beucher (born 1947) has been a tireless promoter of astronomy for several decades. She has served in various official roles for the Astronomical Society of Kansas City and the Astronomical League. Beucher also has helped plan and organize many astronomy conventions and has led several solar eclipse tours. || 
|-id=252
| 53252 Sardegna ||  || Sardinia, in Italian || 
|-id=253
| 53253 Zeiler ||  || Michael Zeiler (born 1956) is a technical writer at the Environmental Systems Research Institute who helped develop the ArcGIS geographic information system || 
|-id=256
| 53256 Sinitiere || 1999 FD || Robert Sinitiere (born 1950), an amateur astronomer and pharmacist. || 
|-id=285
| 53285 Mojmír ||  || Mojmír, ruler of the Great Moravian Empire from (830–845/46). He promoted Christianity in his empire, trying to attach Moravia to Western Europe. || 
|}

53301–53400 

|-id=311
| 53311 Deucalion ||  || Deucalion, the Ancient Greek mythological Adam. After a flood in which all humans were drowned except for Deucalion and (his wife) Pyrrha, an oracle tells them to "throw the bones of their mother" behind them. Puzzled, they decided that their mother is Earth and her bones are stones. The stones they then threw over their shoulders sprang up into people to repopulate the world. || 
|-id=316
| 53316 Michielford ||  || Michiel Ford, American amateur astronomer, recipient of a Milken National Educator Award || 
|}

53401–53500 

|-id=468
| 53468 Varros ||  || George Varros (born 1959) is an amateur astronomer who helped NASA's Meteoroid Environment Office popularize lunar-meteoroid-impact monitoring by amateur astronomers, for the purpose of assessing the dangers to future astronauts during prolonged visits to the lunar surface. || 
|}

53501–53600 

|-id=537
| 53537 Zhangyun ||  || Yun Zhang (born 1990) is a post-doctoral researcher at Université Côte d'Azur whose studies include the numerical modeling of asteroid surfaces and interiors, placing strong constraints on their mechanical and strength properties based on their observed physical properties. || 
|}

53601–53700 

|-id=629
| 53629 Andrewpotter ||  || Andrew E. Potter (born 1926) is a space scientist who discovered the sodium and potassium components of the atmospheres of both Mercury and the moon. || 
|}

53701–53800 

|-bgcolor=#f2f2f2
| colspan=4 align=center | 
|}

53801–53900 

|-id=843
| 53843 Antjiekrog ||  || Antjie Krog (born 1952), a South African writer. || 
|}

53901–54000 

|-id=910
| 53910 Jánfischer ||  || Ján Fischer (1905–1980) was a theoretical physicist and professor at Comenius University, Bratislava. He studied interaction between matter and electromagnetic radiation and significantly contributed to the quantum theory of photoelectric effect and Compton phenomenon. || 
|}

References 

053001-054000